Craig G. Benjamin is an Australian-American historian who is professor of history in the Frederik J. Meijer Honors College at Grand Valley State University, where he teaches East Asian civilization, big history, ancient Central Asian history, and world history historiography. In 2014 and 2015 he served as president of the World History Association.

Biography
Benjamin grew up in Brisbane, Australia. His father was a well-known TV journalist. Benjamin dropped out of college at the age of 19, spending the next 25 years as a professional musician and jazz educator. He pursued his undergraduate education at The Australian National University in Canberra and Macquarie University in Sydney, and gained his PhD in ancient history from Macquarie University in 2003 with his dissertation The Yuezhi: Origin, Migration and the Conquest of Northern Bactria.

Having emigrated to the United States after receiving his PhD, Benjamin has since become professor of history in the Frederik J. Meijer Honors College at Grand Valley State University (GVSU) in Allendale, Michigan. He teaches East Asian civilization, big history, ancient Central Asian history, and world history historiography. Benjamin is the recipient of several teaching awards at GVSU, most notably the 2009 Student Senate Award for Faculty Excellence. He received the Faculty of Distinction Award of the Omicron Delta Kappa Society in 2012 and was a nominee for the 2013 US Professor of the Year Award. In 2015 Benjamin received the Niemeyer Outstanding Faculty Award from GVSU, the highest award that university grants to its faculty members.

Benjamin has presented lectures at conferences throughout the world, and he is the author of several published books, and numerous chapters and essays on the ancient history of Central Asia, Big History and world history. He has recorded lectures for the History Channel and the Discovery Channel, and has been a lecturer for the Big History Project, and on cruises sponsored by both Scientific American and the New York Times. Benjamin has recorded three courses for the Teaching Company's Great Courses series: Foundations of Eastern Civilization, The Big History of Civilizations, and The Mongol Empire.  Together with David Christian and Cynthia Brown, he is the author of the first Big History textbook Big History: Between Nothing and Everything, which was published by McGraw-Hill in August 2014.

Benjamin served as Treasurer and Vice President of the International Big History Association from its inception in January 2011 until July 2018. He is a consultant for the College Board and former co-Chair of the Test Development Committees of the Advanced Placement World History exam, and current Chair of SAT World History exam. In 2014 and 2015 Benjamin served as president of the World History Association.

Benjamin lives in Grand Rapids, Michigan with his wife Pamela. Together they have three children living in Australia and New Zealand. In addition to his academic and musical interests Benjamin is an avid mountain hiker, and has trekked and climbed extensively in many of the great mountain ranges of the planet.  He continues to play jazz, and served as President of the West Michigan Jazz Society, and also as Chair of the Easton Special Events committee which organizes the Eastown Street Fair in Grand Rapids, which draws around 10,000 people each September.

Bibliography

Books
Worlds of the Silk Roads: Ancient and Modern, Christian, D., and Benjamin, C., eds. (Turnhout, Belgium: Brepols Silk Roads Studies Series vol. II, 1998)
Realms of the Silk Roads: Ancient and Modern, Christian, D., and Benjamin. C., eds. (Turnhout, Belgium: Brepols Silk Roads Studies Series vol. IV, 2000)
Walls and Frontiers in Inner Asian History, Benjamin, C., and Lieu, S., eds. (Turnhout, Belgium: Brepols Silk Roads Studies Series vol. VI, 2002)
The Yuezhi: Origin, Migration and the Conquest of Northern Bactria, Benjamin, C. (Turnhout, Belgium: Brepols Silk Roads Studies Series vol. XIV, 2007)
Between Nothing and Everything: Big History, Christian, D., Brown, C., and Benjamin, C. (New York: McGraw-Hill, 2014)
Cambridge History of the World Vol. 4: A World with States, Empires, and Networks, 1200 BCE-900 CE, Benjamin, C., ed. Series editor: Weisner-Hanks, M. (Cambridge: Cambridge University Press, 2015)
The First Silk Roads Era: Empires and the Ancient World 50 BCE-250CE, Benjamin, C. (Cambridge: Cambridge University Press, 2018)
The Routledge Handbook of Big History, Benjamin, C., E. Quaedackers and D. Baker ends. (London: Routledge, forthcoming 2019)

Articles
‘The Kushan Empire’, chap. 26 in The Oxford World History of Empire, P. Fiber Bang, C.A. Bayly and W. Scheidel, eds., (Oxford: Oxford University Press, forthcoming 2017)
‘Collective Learning and the Silk Roads’, in L. Grinin and A. Korotayev, eds., Evolution: From Big Bang to Nanorobots, (Volgograd Russia: Uchitel, 2015) pp. 101–111
‘The Little Big History of Jericho’, Chap. 17 in B. Rodrigue, A. Koratyev, L. Grinin, eds., Big History Anthology, (New Delhi: Primus Books, 2015) pp. 247–263
‘The World from 1200 BCE to 900 CE’, chap. 1 in Cambridge History of the World Vol. 4: A World with States, Empires, and Networks, 1200 BCE-900 CE.  C. Benjamin, ed. Series editor: Weisner-Hanks, M. (Cambridge: Cambridge University Press, 2015) pp. 1–28
‘The Mediterranean c. 1200 BCE – c. 900 CE’, chap. 12 (co-authored with Merry Weisner-Hanks) in Cambridge History of the World Vol. 4: A World with States, Empires, and Networks, 1200 BCE-900 CE. C. Benjamin, ed. Series editor: Weisner-Hanks, M. (Cambridge: Cambridge University Press, 2015) pp. 325–349
‘"But from this time forth history becomes a connected whole": State Expansion and the Origins of Universal History’, in W.G. Clarence-Smith, B.W. Andaya, and M. Weisner-Hanks, eds., Journal of Global History, Vol. 9, Issue 2, Nov. 2014, pp. 357–378
"The great deliverer, the righteous, the just, the autocrat, the god, worthy of worship".  Kanishka I, Kushan Dynastic Religion, and Buddhism, in M. Gervers and G. Long, eds., Toronto Studies in Central and Inner Asia vol. X, (Toronto: University of Toronto Press, 2013) pp. 19–45
‘"Considerable Hordes of Nomads were Approaching." The Conquest of Greco-Bactria – the First ‘Event’ in World History’, in Sun Yue, ed., Global History Review, Vol. 5, (Beijing: China Social Sciences Press, 2012) translated into Chinese, pp. 97–111
Convergence of Logic, Faith and Values in the Modern Creation Myth, in Genet, C., Swimme, B., Genet, R., and Palmer, L. eds., Evolutionary Epic: Sciences Story and Humanitys Response (Los Angeles: Collins Fndtn. Press, 2009) 5000 words
'The Kushans in World History', World History Bulletin Vol. XXV No. 1, Spring 2009, ed. Tarver, H.M., 30–32
Xiongnu and Yuezhi Military Relations, 220–162 BCE, in L. Maracz and B. Obrusanszky, eds., The Heritage of the Huns (Budapest: Hun-Idea Press, 2009, in Hungarian) 37–54
Historiography and World History Teacher Training, Social Studies Review Special Edition, ed. A. Black The New World History (Spring-Summer 2010, vol. 49, No. 1) 8–13
The Carthaginian Invasion of Europe. Polybius, Diodorus, and the Origins of Universal History, in World History Connected, Volume 6, No. 5 (June 2010) 5000 words
Art of Central Asia, in W. McNeill, R. Crozier, D. Christian, and J. McNeill, eds., Art in World History (Great Barrington MA: Berkshire Press, 2011) 31–44
The World from 1200 BCE to 900 CE, chap. 1 in Cambridge History of the World Vol. 4: A World with States, Empires, and Networks, 1200 BCE-900 CE. C. Benjamin, ed. Series editor: Weisner-Hanks, M. (Cambridge: Cambridge University Press, forthcoming 2014) 9000 words
Big History, Collective Learning, and the Silk Roads, in Proceedings of the Inaugural Conference of the International Big History Association, D. Baker, E. Quaedackers, C. Brown and A, Koryatev eds. (Cambridge: Cambridge University Press, forthcoming 2014) 5000 words

External links
Grand Valley State University website
Craig Benjamin explaining Big History. YouTube

References

 
 

Living people
Australian historians
Big History
Macquarie University alumni
Grand Valley State University faculty
Year of birth missing (living people)
Place of birth missing (living people)
Presidents of the World History Association